Dolichancistrus carnegiei is a species of catfish in the family Loricariidae. It is native to South America, where it occurs in the Magdalena River basin in Colombia. The species reaches 17 cm (6.7 inches) in total length.

References 

Ancistrini
Catfish of South America